The Early Day Christian Martyrs was a short film made in 1900 by the Limelight Department of The Salvation Army in Australia. It ran for 100 feet., and was the first narrative film produced in Australia.

It is likely footage from the film wound up in Soldiers of the Cross.

References

External links

Australian historical films
Australian silent short films
1900 films
Australian black-and-white films
Limelight Department films
1900s historical films